Trichoscypha mannii is a species of plant in the family Anacardiaceae. It is found in Cameroon, Ivory Coast, Ghana, Liberia, and Nigeria. It is threatened by habitat loss.

References

External links

mannii
Vulnerable plants
Taxonomy articles created by Polbot